Olesya Syreva (b. 25 November 1983 in Novosibirsk) is a Russian middle/long-distance runner who specializes in the 1500 and 3000 metres. On the February 3rd 2013 she was banned for two years by the IAAF following irregularities on her biological passport. All her results since March 3, 2011 were voided.

International competitions

Personal bests
800 metres - 2:03.69 min (2005)
1500 metres - 4:06.47 min (2006)
3000 metres - 8:55.09 min (2008)
5000 metres - 15:19.96 min (2008)
Half marathon - 1:09:52 min (2008)

See also
List of doping cases in athletics

References

External links

1983 births
Living people
Sportspeople from Novosibirsk
Russian female middle-distance runners
Russian female long-distance runners
Universiade gold medalists in athletics (track and field)
Universiade gold medalists for Russia
Medalists at the 2005 Summer Universiade
World Athletics Championships athletes for Russia
Russian Athletics Championships winners
Doping cases in athletics
Russian sportspeople in doping cases